The following highways are numbered 196:

Ireland
 R196

Japan
 Japan National Route 196

United States
 Interstate 196
 Alabama State Route 196
 Arkansas Highway 196
 California State Route 196 (former)
 Colorado State Highway 196
 Connecticut Route 196
 Florida State Road 196
 Georgia State Route 196
 Iowa Highway 196
 K-196 (Kansas highway)
 Kentucky Route 196
 Maine State Route 196
 M-196 (Michigan highway) (former)
 New Mexico State Road 196
 New York State Route 196
 Ohio State Route 196
 Pennsylvania Route 196
 Tennessee State Route 196
 Texas State Highway 196 (former)
 Texas State Highway Spur 196
 Farm to Market Road 196 (Texas)
 Utah State Route 196
 Virginia State Route 196
 Wyoming Highway 196

Territories:
 Puerto Rico Highway 196